The TVB Star Awards Malaysia is an annual awards ceremony honoring Cantonese programming achievements in Malaysia. It is produced by TVB Entertainment News, with Astro and MY FM as media partners. The ceremony was previously known as the My Astro On Demand Favourites Awards, which succeeded the Astro Wah Lai Toi Drama Awards.

The Malaysian television channel Astro Wah Lai Toi, presented by Astro, airs Hong Kong television programmes produced by TVB. In 2005, Astro organised its first awards ceremony, the 2004 Astro Wah Lai Toi Drama Awards, presenting awards to Hong Kong actors and actresses for their acting achievements in TVB television dramas. TVB Entertainment News took over the production of the awards series in 2013, renaming it The TVB Star Awards. It has since become an annual event, and is regarded as a prelude to Hong Kong's TVB Anniversary Awards.

The nominations for the TVB Star Awards are jointly determined by Astro and TVB for TVB programmes shown on Astro Wah Lai Toi throughout the designated year. Winners are decided by the Malaysian public. Presently, voting is done through a mobile app produced by TVB and Astro.

Categories

Current categories

Current award categories include: My Favourite TVB Drama Series,...Actor and ...Actress in a Leading Role, ...Actor and ...Actress in a Supporting Role, ...Drama Characters, ...On Screen Couple, and ...Drama Theme Song. These categories have been awarded since 2004. In 2011, My Favourite Most Improved TVB Actor and Actress categories were added. In 2013, My Favourite TVB Host In a Variety Program, ...Variety Program, and ...Enrichment Program awards were added bringing the total to thirteen My Favourite TVB awards.

Discontinued or special categories

Discontinued or special categories include: Most Unforgettable Slap in 2004. In 2005, categories included: My Favourite Gunshot, My Favourite Beauty, My Favourite Father-figure, and My Favourite Mother-figure. Most Unforgettable Kiss category was awarded in 2004 and 2008. My Favourite Supporting Character and My Favourite Extreme Appearance were awarded between 2006 and 2008 inclusive. Most Unforgettable Scene was awarded for the years 2004–2008. Most Unforgettable Villain was awarded in 2004, 2008 and 2009. My Favourite Legendary Character and My Favourite Outstanding Popularity King were awarded in 2012. Rising TVB Star in Malaysia was awarded in 2014 and Astro MY FM’s Special Pick for TVB Drama Theme Song  was awarded in 2015.

Honorary awards
The TVB Star Achievement Award was first awarded in 2014.

Years

Favourite TVB Drama Characters

References

Acting awards
Awards established in 2004
Astro Malaysia Holdings
Entertainment events in Malaysia
Mass media in Malaysia